Daedaleopsis hainanensis is a species of white rot poroid fungus that is found in tropical China. It was described as a new species in 2016 by mycologists Hai-Jiao Li and Shuang-Hui He. The type was collected in Jianfengling Nature Reserve (Ledong County, Hainan), where it was found growing on a fallen angiosperm trunk. It is one of five Daedaleopsis species that have been recorded in China.

Description
The fungus is characterized by fruit bodies that are annual, sessile, fan-shaped, dimidiate, or semicircular. The cap surface is smooth, yellowish-brown, and has concentric parallel grooves. Fresh specimens have a rose to pink margin around the pore surface; the pores are round, numbering 3–4 per millimetre. D. hainanensis has a trimitic hyphal system, and the generative hyphae have clamp connections. There are dendrohyphidia and hyphal pegs in the hymenium. spores are sausage shaped to cylindrical, measuring 6–8 by 1.7–2.2 μm.

References

Fungi of China
Polyporaceae
Fungi described in 2016